Conopini is a tribe of the flies family Conopidae. The larvae of species are parasitic on bees, especially bumblebees. Most adults will feed on nectar.

Genera and subgenera 

Genus Conops Linnaeus, 1758
Subgenus Asiconops Chen, 1939
Subgenus Conops Linnaeus, 1758
Subgenus Diconops Camras, 1957
Subgenus Sphenoconops Camras, 1955
Genus Leopoldius Rondani, 1843
Genus Physocephala Schiner, 1861
Genus Physoconops Szilady, 1926
Subgenus Aconops Kröber, 1917
Subgenus Gyroconops Camras, 1955
Subgenus Pachyconops Camras 1955

References 

Parasitic flies
Parasites of bees
Conopidae
Brachycera tribes